Hicham Louissi (born January 19, 1976 in Morocco) is a Moroccan former footballer who spent most of his career playing for Wydad Casablanca.

Career
Born in the Sidi Bernoussi neighborhood of Casablanca, Louissi played youth football for local Club Rachad Bernoussi. After graduating and joining the club's senior side, Louissi began playing professional football with Kuwaiti side Al-Nasr SC (Kuwait) in 1999. He played one season in Kuwait, and then returned to Morocco where he joined Wydad Casablanca.

Louissi was a key defender for Wydad, helping the club win the Moroccan Throne Cup and the 2002 African Cup Winners' Cup. He also scored a crucial goal as Wydad won the 2005–06 Botola, the club's first championship in fourteen years.

References

External links 
Player profile - wydad.com
Official Skyrock

1976 births
Living people
Moroccan footballers
Wydad AC players
Association football defenders